Cingpu is a station on the Red line of Kaohsiung MRT in Ciaotou District, Kaohsiung City, Taiwan.

The station is a three-level, elevated station with one island platform and one exit. It is 154 meters long and is located near the CPC Ciaotou Oil Depot.

Around the station
 National Kaohsiung First University of Science and Technology, about three kilometers away
 Taiwan Sugar Corporation Cingpu Farm
 Taiwan Sugar Corporation Ranch
 Gaonan Highway

References

External links
KRTC Cingpu Station 

2008 establishments in Taiwan
Kaohsiung Metro Red line stations
Railway stations opened in 2008